A gourmand is a person who takes great pleasure and interest in consuming good food and drink. Gourmand originally referred to a person who was "a glutton for food and drink", a person who eats and drinks excessively; this usage is now rare.

Description
The word (from French) has different connotations from the similar word gourmet, which emphasises an individual with a  discerning palate, and is more often applied to the preparer than the consumer of the food. But in practice, the two terms are closely linked, as both imply the enjoyment of good food.

An alternative and older usage of the word is to describe a person given to excess in the consumption of food and drink, as a glutton  or a trencherman.

Regarding the latter usage of the term, there is a parallel concern among the French that their word for the appreciation of gourmet cuisine is historically included in the French Catholic list of the seven deadly sins.

Another alternative use has gained popularity among perfume and cologne designers. In this field, gourmand refers not to a person but to a category of scents related to foods, such as cocoa, apple, and plum.

See also

Ligue des Gourmands, founded by Auguste Escoffier in 1912
Epicure (gourmet), a person interested in food, sometimes with overtones of excessive refinement
An epicure or epicurean (lower-case) is one who pursues fine food and other pleasures sometimes with overtones of excessive refinement; an Epicurean (capitalized) is one who follows Epicureanism, a system of philosophy developed by Epicurus .

References

External links

Food and drink appreciation